Joan Crespo Hita (7 March 1927 – 9 April 2014) was a Spanish professional road bicycle racer, who competed as a professional between 1951 and 1959.

Biography
Joan Crespo was born in Barcelona, Catalonia on March 7, 1927 and died in Barcelona at the age of 87. Crespo turned professional in 1951 with the Spanish team P.C. Nicky's. His main victory was the Trofeo Masferrer in 1958. He finished 39th in the general classification of the 1957 Vuelta a España. Crespo's last win was the GP de Martorell in 1959. Crespo retired from cycling at the end of the 1959 season.

Major results

1951
 2nd Trofeo Jaumendreu
1952
 1st Gran Premio Cataluña
1956
 3rd GP de Martorell
1957
 2nd Trofeo Masferrer
1958
 1st Trofeo Masferrer
1959
 1st GP de Martorell

Vuelta a España results 
 1957: 39th

References

External links
 Joan Crespo Hita on sitiodeciclismo.net

 
1927 births
2014 deaths
Cyclists from Barcelona
Spanish male cyclists
Volta a Catalunya cyclists